Floyd L. Carlisle (1881–1942) was an American businessperson. A graduate of Cornell University, Carlisle owned St. Regis Paper Company, which at one time was the third largest paper company in the United States. Harvard Business School lists him as one of the great American business leaders of the 20th century.

References

1881 births
1942 deaths
Cornell University alumni
Businesspeople in the pulp and paper industry